Artemiy Artemiev (born 13 January 1966) is a Russian composer of electronic and experimental music. Since 1988, he has composed music for more than fifty Russian feature films, and has contributed to several documentary films and television programs. He is the son of renowned composer Edward Artemiev, who is most recognized for his collaborations with film director Andrei Tarkovsky.

Discography
The Warning (1993)
Cold (1994)
Point of Intersection (1997)
Five Mystery Tales of Asia (1998)
Mysticism of Sound (1999)
Forgotten Themes (2000)
Space Icon (2000)
Transfiguration (2002)
Equilibrium (with Karda Estra) (2002)
Time, Desert and a Sound (2004)

References 

Russian electronic musicians
1966 births
Living people